Upton Park may refer to:

in football:
 Upton Park (stadium), London, former home ground of West Ham United football club
 Upton Park F.C., a late 19th and early 20th century football club based in Upton Park, London

places in England:
 Upton Park, London, an area within the London Borough of Newham
 Upton Park tube station, a London Underground station in the area
 Upton Park, Slough, a residential estate
 Upton Park, Merseyside, an area of recreational open space and woodland 
 Upton Park, a public park in Torquay, adjacent to the Town Hall
 Upton Country Park, a public park in Poole, Dorset

See also
Upton (disambiguation)
Upton House (disambiguation)